The UNESCO (United Nations Educational, Scientific and Cultural Organization) has designated 95 World Heritage Sites in 18 countries (also called "state parties") of Western Asia: Armenia, Azerbaijan, Bahrain, Cyprus, Georgia, Iran, Iraq, Israel, Jordan, Lebanon, Oman, Palestine, Saudi Arabia, Syria, Turkey, United Arab Emirates, Qatar and Yemen. While Egypt is partially in Western Asia, its World Heritage Sites are listed under Africa instead. One site is located in Jerusalem. Kuwait is the only country in the region that does not have any World Heritage Sites. Arabian Oryx Sanctuary was designated as a World Heritage Site of Oman in 1994 but was delisted in 2007. As the protected area was reduced by 90% as a result of Oman's decision, UNESCO delisted the site.

In this region, Iran is home to the most inscribed sites with 23 sites. The first sites to be recognized by UNESCO from the region were Persepolis, Meidan Emam, Esfahan, Tchogha Zanbil (Iran) and the Ancient City of Damascus (Syria). Each year, UNESCO's World Heritage Committee may inscribe new sites on the list, or delist sites that no longer meet the criteria. Selection is based on ten criteria: six for cultural heritage (i–vi) and four for natural heritage (vii–x). Some sites, designated "mixed sites," represent both cultural and natural heritage. In Western Asia, there are 67 cultural, 1 natural, and 3 mixed sites.

The World Heritage Committee may also specify that a site is endangered, citing "conditions which threaten the very characteristics for which a property was inscribed on the World Heritage List." Seven sites in this region are currently listed as endangered; one site (Bahla Fort) had been listed previously, and possible danger listing has been considered by UNESCO in a number of other cases.

Legend

Site; named after the World Heritage Committee's official designation
Location; at city, regional, or provincial level and geocoordinates
Criteria; as defined by the World Heritage Committee
Area; in hectares and acres. If available, the size of the buffer zone has been noted as well. A value of zero implies that no data has been published by UNESCO
Year; during which the site was inscribed to the World Heritage List
Description; brief information about the site, including reasons for qualifying as an endangered site, if applicable

World Heritage Sites

Notes

References
General

Notes

Asia, Western
Western Asia